The 1890 Michigan gubernatorial election was held on November 4, 1890. Democratic nominee Edwin B. Winans defeated Republican candidate James M. Turner with 46.18% of the vote.

General election

Candidates
Major party candidates
Edwin B. Winans, Democratic
James M. Turner, Republican
Other candidates
Azariah S. Partridge, Prohibition
Eugene H. Belden, Industrial

Results

References

1890
Michigan
Gubernatorial
November 1890 events